Irizar Island is an island  long, lying  northeast of Uruguay Island in the northeastern part of the Argentine Islands, in the Wilhelm Archipelago, Antarctica. It was discovered by the French Antarctic Expedition, 1903–05, under Jean-Baptiste Charcot, and named by him for Captain Julián Irízar of the Argentine Navy. The island was recharted in 1935 by the British Graham Land Expedition under John Rymill.

See also 
 List of Antarctic and sub-Antarctic islands

References

Islands of the Wilhelm Archipelago